Kill Zone is the eight album by rapper Philthy Rich released on June 26, 2012. It peaked at #40 on the Top Heatseekers Albums chart, making it his first album to chart on the Heatseekers.

Music videos have been filmed for the songs "Light It Up", "Kill Zone", "They Ain't Authentic", "True Religion Shawty", "I'll Find a Way (Dedicated to Dre Freddi)", "My Mex B***h", "3 B****es at the Same Time", "Thinking of You", "Renegade Alert", "I'm Just Pimp'n"., "A Seminary N***a" and "All I Have" featuring Sam.

An album for the leaked tracks that were originally going to be on ''Kill Zone'', ''Kill Zone: The Leak'', was released on March 28, 2012. It features guest appearances from Bobby V, Waka Flocka Flame, Berner and Kafani, among others.

Track listing

Chart positions

References

2012 albums